Kleokyphus is a genus of small air-breathing land snails, terrestrial pulmonate gastropod mollusks in the family Endodontidae, an endemic family of land snails from the Hawaiian islands.

Species
 Kleokyphus callimus Solem, 1976
 Kleokyphus hypsus Solem, 1976

References

 Bank, R. A. (2017). Classification of the Recent terrestrial Gastropoda of the World. Last update: July 16th, 2017

External links

  Solem, A. (1976). Endodontoid land snails from Pacific Islands (Mollusca: Pulmonata: Sigmurethra). Part I, Family Endodontidae. Fieldiana. Zoology. 508 pp. Chicago

Endodontidae
Gastropod genera